James Caan (1940–2022) was an American actor.

James Caan may also refer to:

James Caan (businessman) (born 1960), British-Pakistani entrepreneur and television personality

See also
James Kahn, American writer and medical specialist
James Cain (disambiguation)
James Caine (disambiguation)
James Kane (disambiguation)
James Cane (disambiguation)
James Cayne, businessman